Gerald James Paddio (born April 21, 1965) is an American former professional basketball player who played in three National Basketball Association (NBA) seasons for five different teams – the Cleveland Cavaliers, Seattle SuperSonics, Indiana Pacers, New York Knicks and Washington Bullets. A 6'7" small forward from Kilgore College and the University of Nevada, Las Vegas (UNLV), Paddio was selected by the Boston Celtics in the third round (74th overall) of the 1988 NBA draft. 

In his NBA career, Paddio appeared in 129 games and scored a total of 715 points. His most notable year as a professional was during the 1990–91 NBA season as a member of the Cavaliers when he appeared in 70 games and averaged 7.2 ppg.

During his college playing days at UNLV, he was coached by Jerry Tarkanian. Paddio was an important part of the 1987 UNLV team that reached to the Final Four.

References

External links
 Stats from databasebasketball.com

1965 births
Living people
American expatriate basketball people in Argentina
American expatriate basketball people in France
American expatriate basketball people in Israel
American expatriate basketball people in Italy
American expatriate basketball people in Japan
American expatriate basketball people in Lebanon
American expatriate basketball people in Mexico
American expatriate basketball people in Spain
American men's basketball players
Basketball players from Louisiana
BCM Gravelines players
Boston Celtics draft picks
CB Zaragoza players
Chicago Rockers players
Cleveland Cavaliers players
Club Ourense Baloncesto players
Ferro Carril Oeste basketball players
Grand Rapids Hoops players
Indiana Pacers players
Junior college men's basketball players in the United States
Kilgore College alumni
Liga ACB players
Maccabi Givat Shmuel players
Maccabi Rishon LeZion basketball players
New York Knicks players
Rapid City Thrillers players
Rochester Flyers players
Rockford Lightning players
Seattle SuperSonics players
Seminole State College of Florida alumni
Small forwards
Soles de Jalisco players
Sportspeople from Lafayette, Louisiana
UNLV Runnin' Rebels basketball players
Victoria Libertas Pallacanestro players
Wakayama Trians players
Washington Bullets players